Jigarthanda is a 2014 Indian Tamil-language action comedy film written and directed by Karthik Subbaraj and produced by Kathiresan's Group, features Siddharth, Bobby Simha, Lakshmi Menon, Karunakaran and Guru Somasundaram. Gavemic U. Ary was the film's cinematographer, making his debut in Tamil cinema, and Vivek Harshan was the film's editor. Santhosh Narayanan composed the songs and background score.

The film won two National Film Awards for Best Supporting Actor for Bobby Simha and Best Editing for Vivek Harshan.

The film was also dubbed into Telugu as Chikkadu Dorakadu in 2016. The movie was reported to be inspired by the 2006 South Korean movie A Dirty Carnival. It was remade in Kannada with the same title (2016), in Telugu as Gaddalakonda Ganesh (2019), and in Hindi as Bachchhan Paandey (2022).

Plot
Karthik Subramani is a short-film maker and aspires to make a feature film. He participates in a talent search program (like Naalaya Iyakkunar) and is in the semifinal round. The show's two judges include a highbrow film director Mukil, who trashes Karthik's attempt at filmmaking, and a profit-oriented producer Sundar who riles against Mukil, and declares that Karthik made the best film among the contestants. Though Mukil eliminates Karthik from the contest, Sundar offers to produce a film with Karthik as the director, and both the judges storm out of the show. The next day, Sundar is annoyed that Karthik took his words seriously and came to meet him. He is uninterested in the script that Karthik wants to film, and instead suggests that he wants to make a gangster film along with the style of Nayakan, Thalapathi, The Godfather, etc. Karthik takes this suggestion to heart and sets his mind on documenting the life of a gangster and making a film script out of it.

With help from his journalist uncle, Karthik finds out about "Assault" Sethu, a ruthless gangster in the city of Madurai, and decides that he will make a film about Sethu's life. He travels to Madurai and enlists the help of a reluctant college friend Oorani, to conduct surveillance on Sethu and his men. Since Karthik and Oorani are afraid of approaching Sethu directly, they plot to develop contacts with two of Sethu's top henchmen. They also try to obtain information from an old shopkeeper, "Petti Kadai" Pazhani, who has been around since Sethu was a child. To get closer to Sethu, Karthik also puts up an act of reciprocating the love of Kayalvizhi, whose mother cooks for Sethu. Because of their various attempts to seek information about Sethu, they arouse the suspicion of Sethu's right-hand man Rasu, who puts an underling Sounder to watch Karthik and Oorani. Sounder becomes good friends with Karthik, and Karthik uses his trust to plant a wireless microphone in a music player that he lends to Sounder. In a quick turn of events, Sounder is busted as a mole for an opposing gang and is killed.

Sethu finds out the tap placed in the music player that Sounder was carrying and quickly locates Karthik and Oorani. When about to die at the hands of Sethu, Karthik confesses that he was spying on Sethu so that he could make a movie about his life, along the lines of Nayakan, Thalapathi,  The Godfather, etc. Sethu is enamored by the prospect of his life being portrayed on the big screen and initiates Karthik and Oorani into his gang so that they can document his life. He and his gang members boast of their crimes and take Karthik along for their gang activities. Karthik gleefully documents everything and is ecstatic that he has a fantastic story in hand for his debut movie. When he is ready to leave Madurai with all the information that he ever needed, Kayal discovers that Karthik used her for information and is vengeful. Sethu invites him for a send-off party. During the partying, Kayal remarks that Sethu should act as the main character in the gangster film about his life. Sethu takes this seriously and threatens Karthik to direct the film with Sethu playing himself on screen. Distraught at the sudden turn of events, Karthik tries to flee out of Madurai but is caught by Sethu's gang. They also kidnap the producer of Karthik's film and force them both to make the gangster movie.

Karthik reluctantly agrees but soon finds that Sethu and his men cannot act in front of a camera. He hires an acting coach Muthu, who sets up a rigorous teaching schedule for Sethu and his men. After a period of training, Muthu thinks that while the others are hopeless, Sethu has at least a sliver of acting talent. The production of the movie commences, and Karthik becomes quite frustrated with Sethu's acting ineptitude. Still, he perseveres with the movie and has Muthu coach Sethu in emotional crying scenes in between breaks. Finally, the production is wrapped. Sethu and his men are on cloud nine and create a great fanfare for the movie's release. The film releases, and during the first show, Sethu gets the shock of his life. Realizing that a serious gangster film featuring Sethu would be a disaster, Karthik had surreptitiously changed the story of the film into a comedy. He edits and dubs over Sethu's voice in such a way that the film shows Sethu as a guy who achieves everything in life by crying. The film's title, A. Kumar is revealed to be Azhuguni (Crybaby) Kumar and not Assault Kumar as Sethu had thought. The film receives a tremendous response from the audience, who left theaters in tears after laughing their guts out. Sethu is mad at being made a fool to the world and searches for Karthik. However, Karthik and the rest of the crew go into hiding in anticipation of Sethu's wrath.

While searching for Karthik and his crew, Sethu encounters events that make him realize that the fear that people have for him does not equal respect. He finds that by making people laugh inadvertently through his film, he had earned true respect than respect by fear, such as his mother, who never spoke to him, ever since he became a gangster and finally spoke to Sethu after seeing his film. In a final face-off, Sethu and Karthik meet each other by accident, as the latter is on his way to deliver the video recordings of the former's boastful confessions to the police. Sethu pardons Karthik in a dramatic way, and Karthik chooses to put Sethu's past behind him and let him seek a new life. They each go on to pursue careers in the movie industry. Karthik now has started to use Sethu's gang to bully people such as Vijay Sethupathi into acting for his movies, while Sethu started working as an actor by acting in a film made by Vetrimaaran. Sethu also has married Sounder's wife Ganga, while Karthik married Kayalvizhi.

Cast

 Siddharth as Karthik Subramani, a short film director, who wants to become a feature film director
 Bobby Simha as "Assault" Sethu, a gangster and rowdy in Madurai
 Vijay Sethupathi as Young Sethu and himself (cameo dual roles)
 Lakshmi Menon as Kayalvizhi, Karthik's love interest, whose mother is Sethu's cook
 Karunakaran as Oorni, Karthik's friend
 Guru Somasundaram as Muthu, the acting teacher
 Aadukalam Naren as Sundar, the producer who produces the feature film directed by Karthik
 Soundararaja as Ponram, another local don in Madurai 
 Ramachandran Durairaj as Rasu, Sethu's right hand
 Senthil Kumaran as Sounder, Shekar's spy in Sethu's gang
 Sangili Murugan as "Petti Kadai" Pazhani, a failed and former film director who later opens and runs a shop in Madurai
 Bala Singh as Sandhanam, the first person to killed by Sethu in the film
 Thennavan as Sekhar, Sethu's enemy
 Delhi Ganesh as Subramani, Karthik's father
 Sudha as Karthik's mother
 Gajaraj as Karthik's uncle, journalist
 Ambika as Kayalvizhi's mother
 Rajkumar as Karthik's friend
 Bagavathi Perumal as Film Cinematographer
 Ajay Rathnam as Police Officer
 Bombay Gnanam as Karthik's grandmother
 Vinodhini Vaidyanathan as Ganga, Sounder's wife
 Kaalaiyan as Senthil
 Tiger Garden Thangadurai
 Nassar as Mukil (guest appearance)
 Anthony Daasan as Vettu Kumar, Sethu's henchman (guest appearance)
 Vetrimaaran as himself (guest appearance)
 Aadukalam Murugadoss as himself (guest appearance)
 Nalan Kumarasamy as Aspiring Director (guest appearance)
 Baba Bhaskar (special appearance in the song "Baby")

Production

Development
In mid April 2013, it was reported that Siddharth would be working in a Tamil film to be directed by Karthik Subbaraj, known for his debut film Pizza, which would be produced by Kathiresan under his banner Five Star Films, who was busy then in producing Dhanush starrer Naiyaandi. Karthik Subbaraj declared the same later and added that the film would be a bilingual project. The film was eventually filmed in Tamil only and was later dubbed into Telugu. The Telugu version was titled Chikkadu Dorakadu which was the title of N. T. Rama Rao's 1967 release and Rajendra Prasad's 1988 release. The Telugu version's dialogues were written by lyricist Vennelakanti and the backdrop was altered to Kurnool instead of Madurai.

In an interview to The Hindu, Karthik said that Jigarthanda was supposed to be his directorial debut and that he incorporated some of his experiences in the film during his life at Madurai.

Casting
In the end of May 2013, Lakshmi Menon revealed that she was a part of the film's cast and was paired with Siddharth. Lakshmi Menon's role was later reported to be that of an idli seller, with the actress stating, "I have put in a lot of effort for my role as an idli seller in the film. I visited a few idli shops in Madurai before the shoot and geared up for my character. It's interesting to play such realistic characters". It was rumored in mid July 2013 that Vijay Sethupathi would play the role of the antagonist, but Vijay dismissed the reports and clarified that he would do a cameo only if Karthik obliges as he had no dates. Siddharth was reported to be playing an aspiring film maker who was reported to direct Vijay Sethupathi in the film Pannaiyarum Padminiyum. It was also reported that for this purpose, Vijay Sethupathi acted in the film in an extended cameo appearance. The antagonist role went to Bobby Simha, known for his performances in the films Soodhu Kavvum and Neram, with Subbaraj stating, "I decided not to cast anyone who we thought was an obvious choice for the role, including Vijay Sethupathi. After seeing his performance in Neram, in which Bobby played a gangster, we thought that if we do a complete makeover, he could crack it". After the audio launch, Bobby Simha said in an interaction to the media that he interacted with real gangsters as a part of his preparation for the role. In an interaction to IANS in early March 2014, Siddharth expressed his feelings regarding the role he played, stating, "I'm known for my boy-next-door kind of roles through most of my films. This film has given me the opportunity to get rid of that tag. Post Jigarthanda, audiences won't call me a chocolate boy anymore. This role has allowed me to showcase my versatility".

Filming
The filming started on 12 June 2013 at Madurai. In the end of July 2013, it was reported that the entire filming came to an end with reference to Siddharth's tweet. But Karthik intervened and informed to the press that only 75% of the film's shoot has been wrapped up and Siddharth completed his part and may join during the patch work left. While Siddharth was participating in the shoot of Vasanthabalan's period drama Kaaviya Thalaivan, the shoot continued and in mid-November 2013, Karthik during a press meet about the commencement of Pizza 2: The Villa, the sequel of his debut film which was directed by Deepan Chakravarthy, informed that the film was nearing completion. During that time, the film was in its last schedule of shoot at Chennai. The principal photography finally came to an end on 21 November 2013.

Post-production
In an interview with Baradwaj Rangan, Karthik Subbaraj confirmed that the film would feature Dolby Atmos sound system for realistic effect in sounds when Baradwaj met Karthik along with sound designers Vishnu Govind and Sreesankar, sound mixer Rajakrishnan, and Dolby consultant Dwarak Warrier. S. Venkatraghavan, Cinema Sales Manager — South at Dolby Laboratories. About the usage of Dolby Atmos for a small film which is also a rom-com, Karthik said, "Initially, I thought Jigarthanda would not involve as much work as Pizza. But slowly I found that there was much more work to be done here; there were many live locations and we even shot candid in some places. We needed to recreate all that ambience". Rajakrishnan added that it took a month for the sound mixing process.

Music

Santhosh Narayanan recorded the music for the film along with his newly launched Sandy's Jazz Band. While Santhosh, besides composing, played the keyboard, Australian musicians Hamish Stuart and Graham Jesse played the drums and the saxophone, respectively, and Leon James and Naveen, both from Chennai, played the electronic piano and guitar respectively. Santhosh also worked with a street band from Tanjore to record one song from the film. He also introduced independent musicians, Pradeep Kumar, Sean Roldan, Anthony Daasan, Mani, Kalyani Nair to work with the film's soundtrack. With Muthamil, Arunraja Kamaraj, Anthony Daasan, Pradeep Kumar and Sean Roldan penning lyrics, the album features nine numbers of different genres, which includes fusion, folk and rap, with two instrumentals, one of them being performed by the composer's Sandy Jazz band.
 
The audio rights were purchased by Think Music. The official track list of the film was published on 1 March 2014. The complete soundtrack album was launched on 3 March 2014 at Sathyam Cinemas in Chennai, with the presence of producer S. Thanu and director Bharathiraja. A live band performance of Anthony Daasan took place and theatrical trailer of the film was screened at the event.
 
The album received positive response. The Times of India stated, "Santhosh Narayanan shows, yet again, that he is one of those composers to watch out for — both for his new sounds and tunes. Jigarthanda is another worthy addition" and rated the album 3 out of 5. Baradwaj Rangan in his review wrote, "It’s a good thing Santhosh Narayanan is around. His flamboyant score imbues even the weaker scenes with a Tarantinoesque swagger". Sify wrote, "Santosh Narayanan’s background score is the major plus of the movie, as he is able to capture the mood of the film".
 
Behindwoods rated the album 3.25 out of 5 and stated "If you like to experience new sounds and musical ideas, Jigarthanda is for you!" The album of Jigarthanda was ranked #3 of Top 10 albums in Behindwoods. Music Aloud gave a rating of 8/10 and chose "Kannamma", "Ding Dong", "Pandi Naatu Kodi" and "Dhesayum" as their favourite picks. Indiaglitz rated 3.25 out of 5, stating "Santhosh's innovation works yet again!" Top10Cinema stated "Almost all the songs in ‘Jigarthanda’ are a collage of new endeavours and we can consider this to be a special one. With a couple of songs including ‘Kannamma Kannama’ capturing our senses right in the first time, rest of them would take some time to brew."

The soundtrack of the Telugu dubbed version Chikkadu Dorakkadu was released on 17 July 2014 at Taj Deccan in Hyderabad. The Telugu lyrics had been written by Vennelakanti and Chandrabose. Unlike the original version which have nine songs in the album, the Telugu album has five songs.

Soundtrack 

The original background score was released on 25 August 2014 at the Radio Mirchi FM Station in Chennai. It features the complete soundtrack and background music along with some dialogues from the film.
 
The "Assault Sethu Theme" was listed one of the greatest Villain BGMs in Tamil cinema, by Behindwoods.

Release 
In the end of April, it was reported that the film would possibly release in the third week of May. In early May, it was reported that the film would release worldwide on 23 May 2014. It was initially stated that Sun Pictures would distribute the film which proved as baseless. It was later reported that the film may advance or postpone its release as Rajinikanth's Kochadaiiyaan was scheduled for a big release worldwide on the same day.

The film was given a U/A certificate by the Indian Censor Board due to its violent content. Producer Kathiresan, however, wanted a U certificate to avoid problems while selling the satellite rights of the film, for which the violent sequences were demanded to be cut short, which Karthik Subbaraj did not agree to. Due to the conflict, the film's release got further delayed. After arriving at an agreement —the film was not cut and retained its U/A Certificate— the release date was fixed as 25 July 2014. The release was pushed by a week again before eventually releasing on 1 August 2014.

The film was released in 20 screens in the United States, 5 screens in Australia and 2 screens in UK and Ireland.

Delays
Four days before the film's release, which was slated on 25 July, there were reports that the film would release either on 27 July or 31 July. Siddharth denied those reports and confirmed 25 July as the release date. Siddharth too came to know that the film was postponed and he used his official Twitter handle to express his frustration on the film's delay, and he said "Sorry Jigarthanda fans. External unfair pressure is forcing our film to be postponed. Karthik, our whole team and I worked really hard for Jigarthanda. With no respect for us, without even discussing it with us, it is postponed. Paper ads with theaters list till Tuesday for a Friday release, and then this happens and is Heartbreaking. The producer has personally informed other producers and distributors about the postponement, but he has not informed us yet. Who ever you are who aided in this dirty game, you can delay us you cannot stop us. A good film cannot be killed. All lovers of cinema, please support Karthik & our team. Whenever our film releases, it needs all your help. We are helpless today". His statements, which were out-of-frustration, turned out to be controversial and invoked strong criticism from film personalities in Tamil Nadu.

The next day, producer Kathiresan released a statement explaining the reasons for the postponement. In his statement, he mentioned "Dhanush's Velaiyilla Pattathari is running successfully all over Tamil Nadu, theater owners have requested for one week postponement to get more number of screens for Jigarthanda, and also everyone in the trade feels that will help the film to be a bigger success at the box office". Tamil Film Producers' Council member, T. Siva, criticized Siddharth, stating that actors are getting paid for acting, and they are not supposed to involve and discuss the release of the film. Several other film personalities, including Dhanu, Jaguar Thangam, S. S. Durairaj, Soundarpandian, and Chithra Lakshmanan, also condemned Siddharth's outrage.

Marketing
The first look teaser of the film was released on 9 February 2014 which received positive response and got more than 0.3 million views in 3 days. The first look poster featuring Siddharth holding a gun was released on 12 February 2014. The theatrical trailer of the film was revealed at the audio launch of the film on 3 March 2014, which was well received. The second official trailer was released by the film's team on 17 July 2014. The film's Telugu dubbing rights were bought by Suresh Kondeti and V. Rami Reddy.

Home media 
The satellite rights of the film were sold to Star Vijay.

Reception

Critical reception
The film received widespread critical acclaim. M. Suganth of The Times of India gave 4 stars out of 5 and wrote, "If Pizza was a con movie dressed up as a haunted house horror thriller, Jigarthanda is basically a comedy cloaked as a gangster movie....[The] subversive streak is what makes this film singular and reinforces that Karthik Subbaraj as one of the exciting filmmakers of our time". Bharath Vijayakumar of Moviecrow gave 4 out of 5 stars and said, "Jigarthanda is a must watch for the sheer audacity with which the director has gone about telling his tale. Jigarthanda is a genre defining cinema and a truly unique effort that should stand the test of times". Anupama Subramanian of the Deccan Chronicle gave 3.5 stars out of 5 and wrote, "Aided by his entire cast and technical department, breaking the myth that promising debut filmmakers may not fare in their next, Karthik Subbaraj clearly proves that he is here to stay". J. Hurtado of Twitch Film gave a positive review and said, "'Jigarthanda' is a worldly film that takes influences from within its own very small cinematic orb and transforms them into something that the discerning film fan can meditate on and enjoy. Will the general non-Tamil film fiend miss a few jokes? Yes, quite a lot, actually. However, Jigarthanda manages to make universal that which is culturally specific; it's really quite an accomplishment. Haricharan Pudipeddi of IANS gave 3.5 stars out of 5 and wrote, "If the purpose of Jigarthanda was to deliver a tight slap on the face of the system, it has succeeded in it. Thanks to the impeccable performances of the lead cast, especially Simha, director Subbaraj has conveniently conned us into seeing his film as a gangster flick-turned-comedy caper". S. Saraswathi of Rediff gave the film 3.5 stars out of 5 and concluded, "Jigarthanda is an engrossing gangster film with a series of bizarre twists and turns that keeps you guessing" and added that the film was "definitely a must watch". Siddarth Srinivas of Cinemalead gave 3.5 out of 5 stars and concluded that the film was "Darlingly delicious.". Sify wrote, "Karthik Subbaraj with Jigarthanda has delivered another interesting and intriguing film. It is bold and cannot be slotted into any genre. All ingredients associated with commercial cinema are mixed and served efficiently, though the dish itself becomes cold by the end". Behindwoods gave 3.5 stars out of 5 and called the film "A raw, gritty & imaginative crowd-pleaser". Ramchander of Oneindia Entertainment gave 3.5 stars out of 5 and summarised, "Jigarthanda is an out-of-the-box attempt and it should not be missed by Tamil cine-goers".

Indiaglitz gave 3.25 out of 5 and wrote, "Karthik Subburaj is here to stay, his lateral thinking on taking a leaf out of a gangster tale, changing elements of nature and serving the dish with the right amount of ingredients is no easy task, however he leaves his signature all over". Sundar Sarukkai of Outlook said that "the movie effortlessly makes you think that the other side of being bad is just a cinema away in all of us.", and rated the movie 3 out of 5.

In contrast, Gautaman Bhaskaran of the Hindustan Times gave the film 2 stars out of 5 and wrote, "If Subbaraj wanted to send a moral through his work – shed no blood – Jigarthanda flounders in a maze of 1960s kind of explanatory dialogues, and images that confound, and these despite fine performances by Simha (great expressions and body language) and Karunakaran as Karthik’s sidekick. As for Siddharth, his just about manages to look bewildered, and all the time". Baradwaj Rangan of The Hindu gave a mixed review, writing, "Scene for scene, Jigarthanda is fresh and alive and cracklingly inventive, and there are stupendous stretches of comedy. But the two films – the gangster movie and the meta movie – never really cohere". Arjun P.S. of Plumeria Movies  ranked the film on the first spot in his ′Best Tamil Movies of 2014′ list.

Many people from across the industry praised the film, most notable being director Mani Ratnam, director Gautham Vasudev Menon, director Shankar, actor Vijay and director K. V. Anand.

Box office
According to Behindwoods, the film collected  at the Chennai box office. The film collected  in Tamil Nadu in its first weekend. Owing to public demand and positive word of mouth, about 30 screens were added for the film in Tamil Nadu.

At the international box office, Jigarthanda collected  in the United States. In the UK and Ireland, it earned . The film earned  at the Australian box office. It also earned  in Malaysia. The success of the film in the United States paved way for an increase in the number of screens showing the film to 28. On 25 August 2014, it was reported in the film's official Facebook page that the film had grossed  worldwide in 25 days. It was one of the most profitable ventures of 2014 in Tamil.

Accolades

Remakes 
Jigarthanda was remade in Kannada under the same title. Despite the release of dubbed version in 2016, it was remade in Telugu as Gaddalakonda Ganesh starring Varun Tej and Pooja Hegde. In Hindi, film Bachchhan Paandey starring Akshay Kumar, Kriti Sanon, and Jacqueline Fernandez was inspired by Jigarthanda.

Legacy 
Prior to the release, Forbes India Magazine ranked the film on the fifth spot in its 5 Indian Films to see in India 2014 list, published on 31 December 2013.

In 2019, Film Companion ranked Bobby Simha's performance on the 100 Greatest Performances of the Decade. Bakshi Singh of Film Companion, ranked the film's posters on #2 in the Top 10 Indian Movie Posters of the Decade.

References

External links
 Official Website
 

2014 films
2014 black comedy films
Films set in Madurai
Films shot in Madurai
Films about filmmaking
Indian action comedy films
Indian gangster films
Indian black comedy films
Films scored by Santhosh Narayanan
2010s Tamil-language films
Tamil films remade in other languages
Films featuring a Best Supporting Actor National Film Award-winning performance
Films whose editor won the Best Film Editing National Award
Films directed by Karthik Subbaraj